Mauriki is an association football club from Mele Village, Vanuatu.

In 2015 Mauriki were champions of the TVL First Division and they promoted to compete in the 2015–16 Port Vila Premier League.

Current squad

Honours
TVL First Division
Winner (1): 2014–15

References

Football clubs in Vanuatu
Port Vila